Queen Mary's Park is a small public park in Carshalton Beeches, in the London Borough of Sutton.

It is situated on the old site of Queen Mary's hospital.

History
While the site was a hospital, a model railway was constructed; evidence of which, can still be seen.

References

External links
Official Friends of the Park Group

Parks and open spaces in the London Borough of Sutton